Opera Canada is a quarterly music magazine published by Opera Canada Publications. It is the oldest continuously published arts magazine in Canada. It is an independent magazine separate from the Canadian Opera Association. Along with Opera and Opera News, in the 1990s, the magazine was considered to be one of the three major opera publications in the English-speaking world.

History
In 1960, Opera in Canada was established in Toronto by Ruby Mercer. It was started as a publication for the 300 members of the Canadian Opera Guild. The publication was meant to be a link between the Guild members and its readers. Mercer served as editor and publisher until 1990.

Contents and reception

Bibliographic details
In 1963, the publication's name was changed to Opera Canada. The magazine was quarterly from 1960 to 1974. In 1975, six issues were planned but only five issues were published. Quarterly publication resumed and continued between 1976 and 2004. Five issues of the magazine were published annually 2004-????.  The magazine has once again reverted to a quarterly publication.

Over its lifetime, the magazine has had three publishers as follows:
 Canadian Opera Guild (1960–1966)
 Canadian Opera Association (Toronto) (1966–1974)
 Opera Canada Publications (1974–present)

In February 1976 Opera Canada became an independent magazine. The Canadian Opera Association was the former legal name of the Canadian Opera Company used between 1960–1977. With the third publisher change, the magazine became a non-profit organization in Canada. Individual donors and corporations are entitled to an official receipt per Revenue Canada issued by Opera Canada (registration 118929108RR0001). The website and the printed magazine is available to paid subscribers.  The magazine's other revenue streams are grants, advertising, and newsstand sales.  Each year the publication receives funding from the Canada Council for the Arts, the Ontario Arts Council, and the Canadian Periodical Fund. Printing and targeted advertising within the magazine is delivered by Dovetail Communications Inc.

The editorial succession at Opera Canada was as follows:
 Ruby Mercer: February 1960–1990.
 Harvey Chusid: 1990–1992.
 Cynthia Dann Beardsley: 1992–1993.
 Wayne Gooding: 1993–2022.
 Elizabeth Bowman: 2022–present.

Opera Canada Awards
With an endowment from the estate of Ruby Mercer, the Opera Canada Awards (The Rubies) were established in 2000.  The Rubies recognise and honour outstanding individual achievements on stage and behind the scenes. The first recipients included Maureen Forrester, Stuart Hamilton, and John Cook.

See also

List of music magazines

Footnotes

Notes

Citations

External links
Opera Canada official website
Browse Opera Canada 1996–present
Opera.ca The voice of Opera in Canada

1960 establishments in Ontario
Music magazines published in Canada
Quarterly magazines published in Canada
Magazines about opera
Magazines established in 1960
Magazines published in Toronto